Geoff Bartakovics (born 1977) is an American businessman and entrepreneur. He is the cofounder and CEO of Tasting Table, a digital media brand targeted toward influential foodies. Bartakovics is also a board member or advisor to a number of other digital brands and start-ups, including Trigger Media Group, Inside Hook, Pixafy and Gathered Table.

Before launching Tasting Table in 2008, Bartakovics was a business manager in asset-backed finance at UBS Investment Bank. He studied English literature at the University of Chicago, and studied comparative literature and philosophy at the University of Hamburg as a Fulbright Scholar.

In 2012, he was named one of Out magazine's OUT 100.

References 

American food industry business executives
1977 births
Living people
American technology executives
University of Chicago alumni
21st-century American businesspeople
University of Hamburg alumni